John C. McKinley (November 20, 1859 – May 1, 1927) was a lawyer and Republican politician from the state of Missouri. He was the state's 26th Lieutenant Governor as well as a member of the Missouri Senate.

Personal history
John C. McKinley was born near Mendota in Putnam County, Missouri to parents Degraphenreed and Elizabeth (Harmon) McKinley, the oldest of nine children. McKinley was a distant relative of two U.S. Presidents, James A. Garfield and William McKinley. John C. McKinley was a lawyer by profession when not engaged in politics. He married Affa Grant on May 6, 1888. McKinley died in Punam County, Missouri on May 1, 1927 and is buried in the Unionville, Missouri cemetery.

Political history
McKinley was first elected to the Missouri Senate in 1902. However he did not serve the full four-year term, having been elected Missouri Lieutenant Governor in 1904. John C. MicKinley was an unsuccessful candidate for several other offices including U.S. Senate in 1908, 1910, and 1922. He was also a candidate for Missouri Governor in the 1912 election, losing to Elliot W. Major.

References

Missouri Republicans
Lieutenant Governors of Missouri
1859 births
1927 deaths
People from Putnam County, Missouri